Ala' al-Din al-Bukhari, was a Hanafi jurist (faqih), Maturidi theologian, commentator of the Qur'an (mufassir), and a mystic (Sufi). Sa'id Foudah suggest that he followed the Naqshbandi path.

He is perhaps best known for issuing a fatwa (a legal ruling) whereby anyone that gives Ibn Taymiyya the title "Shaykh al-Islam" is a disbeliever, and authored a book against him entitled "Muljimat al-Mujassima".

Ibn Nasir al-Din al-Dimashqi (d. 846/1438) countered this fatwa by authoring Al-Radd al-Wafir 'ala man Za'am anna man Samma Ibn Taymiyya Shaykh al-Islam Kafir, in which he listed all the authorities who had ever written in praise of Ibn Taymiyya or called him Shaykh al-Islam.

He was born in Persia in 779 A.H./1377 A.D., and grew up in Bukhara and later travelled extensively to India, Arabia, Egypt and Syria. After involving himself in debates in Cairo between supporters and opponents of Ibn 'Arabi, he moved to Damascus where he composed the "Fadihat al-Mulhidin wa Nasihat al-Muwahhidin" and also proceeded to attack Ibn Taymiyya, to the anger of the city's Hanbalis.

He was praised by some scholars of his time, like Ibn Hajar al-'Asqalani, and Badr al-Din al-'Ayni.

Life 
He was born in Bilad al-'Ajam (Persia was often called Bilad al-'Ajam [land of 'Ajam]) and educated in Bukhara, where he studied under Sa'd al-Din al-Taftazani. It was from him that al-Bukhari inherited a profound dislike for monistic philosophy, which he saw as synonymous with Ibn 'Arabi and his followers. Al-Bukhari traveled widely in Iran and Central Asia searching for competent religious. From an early age he excelled in traditional and rational sciences such as the Qur'an, hadith, rhetoric, logic, poetry, and dialectics. He also studied classical Sufi manuals and was seen by many as an accomplished Sufi master. A well-rounded individual with broad intellectual horizons, al-Bukhari for some time resided in India, where his preaching and lectures earned him great popularity among Indian Muslims. Having favorably impressed a local ruler, al-Bukhari was invited to serve as his personal religious tutor and advisor. However, a man of principle, he soon fell out with his Indian patron and left the Subcontinent for Mecca, where he lived for several years until the Mamluk sultan Bars Bay (r. 825/1422-841/1438) invited him to the Egyptian capital. Soon after his arrival, he was embroiled in a vociferous public dispute over Ibn 'Arabi's orthodoxy, in the course of which he clashed with the influential Maliki qadi of Egypt, Muhammad al-Bisati (d. 842/1438), who advised caution in this matter. Following a public altercation with his opponent, an angry al-Bukhari took ostentatious leave of Cairo to the great chagrin of his Egyptian partisans.

In Syria, where he settled after his departure, al-Bukhari kept thinking about his "humiliation" at the hands of al-Bisati and composed a lengthy refutation of Ibn 'Arabi and his school, titled "Fadihat al-Mulhidin wa Nasihat al-Muwahhidin" Or, in another translation:. Simultaneously, he got himself involved in another fierce controversy. Ironically, this time his target was Ibn 'Arabi's archenemy, Ibn Taymiyya, whom al-Bukhari accused of certain juridical "innovations." Al-Bukhari's critique caused a great uproar in Syria that was home to many influential followers of Ibn Taymiyya. Unmindful of the wide opposition to his critique among his Syrian colleagues, al-Bukhari boldly demanded that Ibn Taymiyya be divested of his honorific title of shaykh al-Islam, proclaiming everyone who refused to do so an unbeliever. His condemnation of Ibn Taymiyya drew severe criticism and eventually a book-size refutation by the Shafi'i scholar Ibn Nasir al-Din al-Dimashqi (d. 838/1434)27 who sent his opus to Egyptian scholars for approval. As one might expect, upon receipt of this work, Muhammad al-Bisati seized the opportunity to denounce his former prosecutor as an ignoramus and troublemaker. Al-Bukhari's acrimonious polemic with the Syrian supporters of Ibn Taymiyya did not cause him to forget about his hostility to Ibn 'Arabi, whom he continued to accuse of heresy and juridical incompetence.

See also 
 Abu Ishaq al-Saffar al-Bukhari
 Abu al-Mu'in al-Nasafi
 Abu al-Yusr al-Bazdawi
 Nur al-Din al-Sabuni
 Muhammad Zahid al-Kawthari
 List of Hanafis
 List of Ash'aris and Maturidis
 List of Muslim theologians
 List of Sufis

References

External links
 Le Chaykh 'Alâ-ou d-Dîn Al-Boukhâri dit qu'attribuer le corps à Allâh est de la mécréance par unanimité 

Hanafis
Maturidis
15th-century Muslim theologians
Logicians
Sunni Sufis
Sunni imams
Sunni fiqh scholars
Sunni Muslim scholars of Islam
Quranic exegesis scholars
Uzbekistani Muslims
Critics of Ibn Taymiyya
Critics of Ibn Arabi
1377 births
1437 deaths
1438 deaths